The Australian Society of Section Car Operators (ASSCO), is an accredited railway operator that seeks access to railways for its members. It was originally registered as a non-profit organisation, under the Associations Incorporation Act in South Australia.

Group history

ASSCO was founded in November 1999, after a series of informal meetings, by a group of motor section car owners who were running in South Australia.

At the time, many cars were being run using the insurance and systems of a number of heritage railways, including Steamtown, and often under the "work for ride" banner. Changes to the regulatory regime in South Australia allowed for the accreditation of a body as a railway owner and operator, subject to meeting the requirements of Australian Standard AS4292 Railway safety management.

ASSCO was established to hold the accreditation, and in 2000, work commenced on the preparation of a safety management case for the group. The case considered obligations under the Rail Safety Act, Occupational Health Safety and Welfare Act, AS 4801/4804, AS4360, AS4292 and ISO 9000 quality systems. Interim accreditation was achieved in June 2000  Work to prepare the safety case was done by one of the founding members, with operational experience coming from a former railwayman, whilst a number of the processes used by the North American Railcar Operators Association were considered and, were necessary, modified to meet Australian Regulatory requirements.

By April 2001, the organisation had in place an access agreement, which meant accreditation could be granted. ASSCO was the first not-for-profit ("Heritage") railway to be granted accreditation as a railway operator without owning or managing its own railway line in South Australia. It was also the first heritage operator to start up under the regulatory regime since it was implemented. The committee at the time, and subsequently, has avoided taking (long term) responsibility for any infrastructure, because of the work and cost associated with its maintenance. That said, the group has held a lease over the railway between Kevin and Penong on the Far West of Eyre Peninsula.

Originally, operations focused on the railways of South Australia. Although realised early on that other states would be essential to assist the group to grow, work for access in other states did not commence for a few years  ASSCO surrendered its accreditation in SA during 2010 after regulatory intervention by the then South Australian Office of the Rail Safety Regulator. It last operated in South Australia in 2004.

First run
After gaining accreditation, the group made a number of approaches to heritage and commercial railway operators for access.

The first railway to agree to host an ASSCO meet was NRG Flinders Operating Services Pty Ltd, operator of the Leigh Creek line, between Port Augusta and Copley. This was the longest run for section cars at the time, some 250 km. The event was run over the Easter Long Weekend, 2001. This line carried one coal train each way each day, meaning the trip crossed trains both days.

Other runs
ASSCO has also operated on railways owned by One Rail Australia, Pichi Richi Railway, the Australian Electric Transport Museum and Lions Club of YPRail. It has also leased the Kevin Penong line for two weekends.

In line with its current focus on Queensland railways, ASSCO operates over the 42" gauge trackage of Queensland Railways. It has operated as far north as Cairns, including the Normanton-Croydon Railway. Its first run on the QR network was over the now closed line between Theebine and Kingaroy in April 2003

The group has accessed a limited number of heritage railways, including the Mary Valley Rattler. Mary Valley hosted ASSCO for a commissioning and training day on 23 March 2003.

Insurance problems
Like many heritage railways, ASSCO was adversely effected of the insurance crisis in the early part of the decade (2002–2003). Whilst a few thought the organisation was dead, work to regain insurance continued. This included support of other programs, even when these did not benefit the organisation directly.

ASSCO was eventually invited into a group insurance scheme run through the Council of Historic Railways and Tramways of South Australia Inc, enabling it to restart operations. This move also benefited other heritage railways in South Australia, as its contribution reduced the overall premium payable by other heritage railways. More recently, the group moved into other pooled premium schemes, and the cost of insurance on the open market has fallen considerably.

ASSCO does not carry members of the public. However, members are themselves tourists, and provide a considerable boost to local economies where they operate.

Sharing the benefit
The group realised the benefit of synergistic working when it was founded. That is, there must be a benefit for the organisation which hosts a run, or for a commercial railway owner, the access should be cost neutral, if not at a small profit.

Indeed, ASSCO members have provided a number of organisations with non-pecuniary benefits as a result of access.

Current operations

Apparently, the largest group of participants ever attended its Monto Loop Run (19 cars and 32 people) on a trip between Biggenden and Calliope in Queensland in April 2010.

During 2018, its website suggested that it intended operating in New South Wales between Tamworth and Armidale during Quarter 4 - this reference was removed during September 2018.

However, after intervention by the Office Of the National Rail Safety Regulator (ONRSR) to address systemic issues with its Rail Safety Management System during 2019, which required it to suspend operations (or be subject to other "unpalatable actions"), the group proposed to expand operations into Tasmania and New South Wales in 2020. It did not meet this objective 
The message published by the ONRSR does not reference the requirements under RNSL for the exercise of reasonable due diligence, and the role of good governance and effective management and control in relation to the effectiveness of an SMS.

The organisation has around 50 members of which 30 are active

Affiliations
ASSCO was an International Affiliate of North American Railcar Operators Association (NARCOA).

References

External links
 

Railway companies established in 1999
Heritage railway companies of Australia
Australian companies established in 1999